Karla's World is a 2007 Danish movie based on the 2003 book of the same title written by Renée Simonsen, the film is directed by Charlotte Sachs Bostrup.

Cast

External links
  

2007 films
2000s Danish-language films
2007 drama films
Danish drama films